ČSA Flight 523, operated by an Ilyushin Il-18D, was a scheduled flight from Prague Ruzyně International Airport (PRG/LKPR), Czechoslovakia to Havana via Shannon Airport and Gander International Airport, with 69 people on board, on 5 September 1967 it crashed on climb-out from Gander.

In 2015 a memorial plaque was unveiled in Gander to honour its victims.

Crash
On 5 September 1967, ČSA Flight 523 crashed on climb-out from Gander International Airport, after being re-fuelled for the final leg of the flight. The aircraft took off from runway 14 climbing at an abnormally shallow angle. Four crewmen and 33 passengers were killed.

The aircraft was relatively new, manufactured in April 1967, having flown only 766 hours. The crew, replaced by a fresh one in Gander, consisted of a captain with over 17,000 hours experience (over 5,000 on the Il-18), familiar with the airport as he had been flying there since 1962, and a co-pilot with over 10,000 hours experience.

Investigation
The investigation of the incident started immediately; Czechoslovak and Soviet experts, including Genrikh Novozhilov from Ilyushin and the Czech World War II fighter pilot František Fajtl, also took part in it. Several possibilities were discussed but the cause of the accident was never determined.

References

Aviation accidents and incidents in 1967
Czech Airlines accidents and incidents
Accidents and incidents involving the Ilyushin Il-18
Airliner accidents and incidents in Canada
Gander, Newfoundland and Labrador
1967 in Newfoundland and Labrador